Krasnov is a Russian family name, derived from the word krasota, a diminutive for krasa, "beauty". Its feminine counterpart is Krasnova. It may refer to:

Aleksandr Krasnov (born 1960), Russian cyclist
Aleksandr Krasnov (astronomer) (1866–1911), Russian astronomer
Krasnov (crater) on the Moon, named after Aleksandr Krasnov
 Andrei Krasnov (1862–1914), Russian botanist and biogeographer
Angelina Zhuk-Krasnova (born 7 February 1991), Russian pole vaulter
 Danny Krasnov (born 1970), Soviet-Israeli pole vaulter
Ivan Krasnov (1802–1871), general, author and father of Nikolay
Nikolay Krasnov (soldier) (1833–1900), major-general and father of Pyotr
 Nikolay Krasnov (architect), 1864-1939, Russian and Yugoslav architect
Pyotr Krasnov (1869–1947), lieutenant-general and member of the White movement during the Russian Civil War and a Nazi collaborator during World War II
Vera Krasnova (born 1950), Russian speed skater
Vladimir Krasnov (born 1990), Russian Olympic sprinter
Semyon Krasnov (born 1946), member of the White movement during the Russian Civil War and father of Mikhail Krasnov

Fiction
Yevgenia Nikolayevna Krasnova, a fictional character in The Black Swan: The Impact of the Highly Improbable

See also
 Rurik Dynasty

Russian-language surnames